Chaparritas El Naranjo is a pasteurized and non-carbonated beverage owned by the Spaniard Company Mezgo (Chairman Gonzalo Manuel Gómez y Martínez de Escobar). It was the first bottled non-carbonated beverage in Mexico, and was introduced in 1947).

Flavors 
Grape
Tangerine
Pineapple

References

Products introduced in 1947
Mexican drinks